Louis de Gonzague Bobozo (1915 – July 1982) was a Congolese military officer who served as commander-in-chief of the Armée Nationale Congolaise from 1965 until 1972.

Biography 
Louis Bobozo was born in 1915 in the Mongala District, Équateur, Belgian Congo. He voluntarily enlisted in the Force Publique on 28 June 1933. On 1 April 1940 he was promoted to the rank of sergeant. In 1941 he was deployed to Ethiopia to participate in the East African Campaign of World War II, commanding a machine gun platoon during the Siege of Saïo. From 1953–1954 he served as drill instructor to the young Joseph-Désiré Mobutu in Luluabourg and became his mentor. He was one of the few Congolese soldiers in the entire army to achieve the rank of adjutant before the independence of the Congo in 1960. 

Following independence, the Force Publique mutinied to protest poor conditions. African officers were appointed to replace European personnel to alleviate the problem, and Mobutu was made chief-of-staff of the force, renamed the Armée Nationale Congolaise (ANC). Due to the upheaval in the officer corps and his family ties with Mobutu, Bobozo was quickly promoted to colonel and put in charge of the garrison of Camp Hardy in Thysville. He briefly acted as interim commander-in-chief of the army in October. In 1963 he was put in charge of a new unit, the fourth groupement (regiment) of South Katanga. On 30 May 1964 he led a small government force to recapture the town of Albertville from Simba rebels. In July 1964 he was promoted to the rank of major general.

Following Mobutu's coup in November 1965, Bobozo was appointed commander-in-chief of the ANC. On 13 November 1970 he suffered a severe stroke and had to relinquish his duties to an acting general. He officially retired as commander-in-chief in 1972. He died in July 1982.

Citations

References 

 
 
 
 
 
 
 
 
 
 
 

Soldiers of the Force Publique
Belgian military personnel of World War II
People of the Congo Crisis
Democratic Republic of the Congo military personnel
People from Mongala
1915 births
1982 deaths